The University of Namibia (UNAM) is a multi-campus public research university in Namibia, as well as the largest university in the country. It was established by an act of Parliament on 31 August 1992.

Background 
UNAM comprises the following faculties and schools: 
 Faculty of Agriculture and Natural Resources
 Faculty of Economics & Management Science
Department of Political Science
 Faculty of Education
 Faculty of Humanities and Social Sciences
 Faculty of Law
 School of Medicine
 Faculty of Engineering and Information
 Faculty of Science
 School of Nursing
 School of Pharmacy
 School of Public Health
 School of Military Science
 Centre for Postgraduate Studies
Ranked in the top 30 of tertiary institutions on the continent in the past 10 years, UNAM is one of the best universities in Africa. The University of Namibia is the only institution in the world to offer a doctorate in the study of the Khoekhoe language.

Faculty of Engineering and Information Technology 
The Faculty of Engineering and Information Technology was founded on 1 January 2008 following the dissolution of the Department of Engineering and Technology, which had existed under the Faculty of Science since 2000.  Sam Nujoma, the first president of Namibia and then-chancellor of the university conducted the groundbreaking ceremony at Ongwediva on 17 November 2007. The ceremony took place on a 13-hectare plot of land that had been donated to UNAM by the Ongwediva town council.

In January 2008, the National Planning Commission approved funding for the construction of phase 1 of the new Faculty of Engineering and Information Technology (FOET) in Ongwediva. Construction work began in April 2008 with emphasis on lecture rooms, staff offices, laboratories, IT facilities, student hostels, staff houses and other support facilities. The completion of these facilities (phase 1A) enabled the first batch of students to be admitted in the FOET.

Academics
Notable academics at the University of Namibia have included Bience Gawanas, former ombudsperson, professor Nico Horn, André du Pisani, Lazarus Hangula, Dorian Haarhoff, Elizabeth Amukugo, Erold Naomab, Job Amupanda and Günter Heimbeck.

Marks scandal
In 2011 reports appeared that UNAM's lecturers had been exchanging marks for sexual favours from students, and exchanging completed assignment for money. It was claimed this had resulted in serious academic degradation. Investigating and combating such illegal practices have since become a priority for the Namibian government and UNAM management.

Notable alumni
The University of Namibia has produced several notable and famous public individuals since its founding, including:
 Sebastian Ignatius ǃGobs, Namibian politician – Class of 1995
 Fransina Kahungu, former mayor of Windhoek
Theo-Ben Gurirab, received a Doctorate of Law honoris causa – Class of 1999
Pendukeni Iivula-Ithana received Bachelor of Laws and B.Juris degrees –  class of 1998 and 1999
 Alfredo Tjiurimo Hengari, political scientist and presidential spokesperson to Hage Geingob – Class of 2001
 Monica Geingos, First Lady of the Republic of Namibia and businesswoman – Class of 2002
 Petrina Haingura, Namibian politician – Class of 2002
 Sacky Shanghala, former Namibian minister of justice – Class of 2003
 Sisa Namandje, Namibian lawyer – Class of 2003 
 Bernadus Swartbooi, Namibian politician and president of the Landless People's Movement (Namibia) – Class of 2003
 Peya Mushelenga, Minister of Urban and Rural Development – Class of 2003
 Tangeni Amupadhi – journalist and editor of The Namibian newspaper – Class of 2005
 Sam Nujoma, Namibian politician and former President of Namibia – Class of 2007
 Lucia Iipumbu, Deputy Minister of Industrialisation, Trade and SME development – Class of 2008
 Job Amupanda, Namibian politician and leader of the Affirmative Repositioning and current mayor of Windhoek – Class of 2010
 Francine Muyumba, Congolese Senator, Former President of the Panafrican Youth Union – Class of 2012
 Joseph Kalimbwe, youth activist and author – Class of 2017
 Henny Seibeb, Namibian politician and deputy president of the Landless People's Movement (Namibia) – Class of 2019
 Inna Hengari, member of Parliament, youth politician and student leader – Class of 2019 
 Utaata Mootu, member of Parliament, youth politician – Class of 2019
 Emma Theofelus, member of Parliament, youth politician – Class of 2019
 Patience Masua, member of Parliament, youth politician - Class of 2020

See also
UNAM SRC

References

External links
University of Namibia website

 
Universities in Namibia
Educational institutions established in 1992
1992 establishments in Namibia